This is a list of characters from Capcom's Darkstalkers fighting game series and animated-media franchise, who are either based on various iconic literary and cinematic monsters, or inspired by international mythology and fairy tales. The greatest of these supernatural creatures, and the greatest among those who hunt them, will engage in combat to determine who will own the night, while participating in a tournament held on Earth in order to decide the new ruler of the otherworldly dimension of Makai.

The games are set in a pastiche gothic horror universe, as is the 1997 Japanese anime miniseries Night Warriors: Darkstalkers' Revenge, which was based on the first two titles and was faithful to the characters' in-game personalities. The 1995 American-produced animated series, simply titled Darkstalkers, ignored the games' and characters' backstories in favor of a standard good-versus-evil plot.

Overview

Introduced in Darkstalkers

Anakaris 
Voiced by: Kan Tokumaru, Zoltan Buday (Animated Series Ep. 1-2, 4), Scott McNeil (Animated series Ep. 3,5-13)

 is a massive 5,000-year-old Egyptian mummy who was once the pharaoh of a powerful empire prior to his death. He seeks to regain his rule following his resurrection by Pyron, and gains immense power from battling the other Darkstalkers before traveling back in time to restore his empire. When it comes under threat again, he assumes his mummy form for battle. In the Darkstalkers 3 storyline, following the successful restoration of his kingdom, Anakaris travels back to the present time and enters Majigen, a magical realm created by Jedah within the otherworldly dimension of Makai (Japanese for "demon world") expressly for imprisoning souls deemed valuable. During the battles within, he learns that the destruction of his empire is unavoidable, and he therefore journeys back in time once again to transport his kingdom to a new dimension, so that it may be free of the wars of Earth.

In addition to being one of seven Darkstalkers characters to feature as a playable in every series installment, Anakaris appeared in Marvel vs. Capcom 2 and Capcom Fighting Evolution. He has a minor role in the 1995 cartoon as one of Pyron's henchmen, and was portrayed as simple-minded while frequently speaking nonsensical phrases. In the 1997 anime miniseries, he makes his only appearance during a flashback sequence at the beginning of the fourth and final episode, when he is defeated in combat by Pyron. SOTA Toys displayed a prototype Anakaris action figure at the 2006 San Diego Comic-Con along with Morrigan and Lord Raptor, but the figures were never released.

He has also appeared in Marvel vs Capcom 2 and Capcom Fighting Jam.

Anakaris was one of only two series characters to make Complexs 2012 list of the hundred "most humiliating" video game victory quotes ("You are not worthy to clean my tomb!" from Darkstalkers 2), with the site adding: "We think cleaning the tomb would be a worse punishment". GamesRadar described him as "a much needed part" of the games, "because what cast of monsters isn't complete without a mummy?" The site additionally rated him second in their 2013 list of the top twenty video-game mummies. Daniel Feit of VentureBeat published a tribute article about the character in 2010: "Anakaris is unlike any other character in [Capcom]’s history. Don’t seal him away in the tomb of obscurity". The cartoon version of Anakaris was dismissed by 411mania.com as "a joke" who was "basically Homsar with bandages around his body". 

Anakaris' name is a reference to Kharis, the central antagonist of the 1940s Universal Mummy films.

Bishamon 
Voiced by: Kan Tokumaru (games); Masashi Ebara (anime); Don Brown and Michael Dobson (anime, English), Colin Murdock (Animated series)

 is a ghostly Japanese samurai who inhabits a cursed suit of armor and sword that he mysteriously acquires from an antique shop. He initially has no memory of doing so but then discovers that he had taken the items by force. This plotline is carried over into Darkstalkers 2, in which Bishamon puts on the armor, called Hannya ("the armor of hate"), which infuses him with evil and forces him into a killing spree to satisfy its demand for sacrifice. When Bishamon fights Pyron, he sheds the armor and successfully breaks the curse, and to amend for his sins, he and his wife become priests, and the practice they teach cleanses the mind and spirit of its followers. He later learns about a separate dimension called Makai; to prevent history from repeating itself, he enters the dimension to seal away the armor, which soon creates a body from spirits to hunt down Darkstalkers. Bishamon locks the armor away before it can accomplish its task, but he is not seen again thereafter.

In the second episode of the 1997 anime miniseries, Bishamon lays in wait to attack anyone passing through a valley outside a Japanese city. He kills two hunters who attempt to steal his armor, but is stopped by Donovan before he can then slaughter a group of travelers that had been accosted beforehand by the hunters. After Bishamon impales Donovan with his sword during battle, the armor becomes confused upon witnessing Donovan's attempts to save the humans in his wounded state despite possessing dark blood, causing the armor to temporarily break its hold and reveal Bishamon's human form, who expresses his pity at Donovan's ongoing internal conflict. In the animated series, he is instead tricked into taking the sword by a crooked shōgun, and he demands that Donovan kill him because of his Darkstalker status, but Donovan destroys the sword instead, breaking the curse.

Bishamon's name was inspired by the Buddhist deity Vaiśravaṇa, known in Japan as Bishamonten. The character makes an unplayable cameo appearance in Capcom vs. SNK 2.

Demitri Maximoff

Felicia

Huitzil 
Voiced by: Juurouta Kosugi (games); Ward Perry (anime, English), Ian James Corlett (Animated series))

Huitzil is a boss character from the first game and a playable in the second. He is one of an army of identical giant, disproportionately-shaped robots that are classified by his name in plural form ("the Huitzil" or simply "Huitzils" in the 1997 anime) and who were constructed by Pyron 65 million years ago with orders to destroy all life on the planet Earth, but after they succeed in obliterating the dinosaurs, a massive earthquake traps everything deeply beneath Earth's layers until 520 A.D., when one of the robots was unearthed and utilized by the Mayans as a guardian of Central America against evil forces before being abandoned in the ruins of the Mesoamerican city of Teotihuacan (in pre-Columbian Mexico). When Pyron returns to present-day Earth, he revives the robot in order for it to complete Pyron's original commands, but a malfunction causes Huitzil to instead carry out different orders of guarding a young Mayan boy named Cecil from Jedah's advances as he enters the realm of Majigen.

Huitzil is named  in the Japanese versions of the games, and he makes a cameo appearance alongside Mega Man character Roll, also a robotic character, in her ending from the 2008 crossover fighter Tatsunoko vs. Capcom: Ultimate All-Stars. His design was inspired by prehistoric-Japanese dogū figurines, and his name translates to "hummingbird" in Nahuatl and is likely a shortening of Huitzilopochtli, the Mesoamerican god of war who was part of the Aztec pantheon of gods that included Quetzalcoatl. He makes a one-episode appearance in the 1995 animated series, in which he has a powder-blue palette and speaks with a Hispanic accent. His storyline was changed to his having been created by Quetzalcoatl and being able to easily manhandle Pyron, whom he attempts to sacrifice to the sun due to his being an alien, but he is ultimately hacked to pieces by Bishamon. Huitzil and Donovan were the only Darkstalkers characters who did not appear in the series finale. In the anime, the robots serve as Pyron's footsoldiers and are capable of transforming into various types of weapons. However, Huitzil is eventually destroyed for the third time in the combined game and animated continuities, this time by Pyron near the climax after unsuccessfully attempting to rebel against him in order to prevent the obliteration of Earth.

Tom Goulter of GamesRadar commented on the futuristic nature of the character in the otherwise Gothic atmosphere of the series: "If you play the fantasy-themed Darkstalkers to avoid fighting robots with lasers and buzzsaws, sorry, but those things are Huitzil's total stock-in-trade". His ending in the 1998 home version of Vampire Savior, in which he dies at the hands of Jedah but manages to reactivate his fellow robots to continue protecting Cecil, was ranked at #155 in 4thletter's 2013 ranking of the top 200 fighting game endings: "The robots decide to scan [a] city and classify everything under two options: the boy they must protect, or threats they must destroy to protect him. Uh oh".

Jon Talbain 
Voiced by: Yūji Ueda (games); Fumihiko Tachiki (anime); Alvin Sanders (anime, English) Lee Tockar (Animated series)

Jon Talbain is an English werewolf born to a lycanthropic father and a human mother who had died in childbirth. In his storyline, his father is Baraba Kreutz, the patriarch of the Kreutz family (one of the seven noble families of Makai) known as "the Wolf Lord", who himself was a Darkstalker and onetime rival of Demitri, but had mysteriously disappeared before his son's birth. A loner by nature, Jon Talbain maintains his humanity upon finding out he is a Darkstalker by cursing his fate while developing his fighting skills. While he lifts his curse and regains his human form after his victory over Pyron, his blood remains tainted. During the battles in Majigen in Darkstalkers 3, he comes face to face with Dark Talbain, his evil alter ego. Jon Talbain's fate is unknown after defeating his counterpart, but his ending shows that he is the guardian of two children who await his return from Majigen.

Jon Talbain is called  in Japan, and his name is a play on Sir John Talbot, the father of Lon Chaney, Jr.'s werewolf character in the 1941 film The Wolf Man. He has not featured as a player character in any Capcom crossover games, and has a minimal presence in the 1995 animated series. In the 1997 anime, he plays his largest part in the third episode when he rescues Felicia from an army of Pyron's Huitzil units and then later aids her in destroying them by way of detonating a train packed with explosives. He was featured with Baby Bonnie Hood in a two-figure set released by Toy Biz in 1999.

GamesRadar placed him fourth in their 2013 list of the ten best video-game werewolves: "Take legendary martial artist Bruce Lee into the woods at midnight, then force him to get bitten by a werewolf". Arcade Sushi ranked his "Beast Cannon" special move, in which he launches himself shoulder-first into his opponents, at 25th in their 2013 selection of the 25 most iconic fighting-game moves.

Lord Raptor 
Voiced by: Yūji Ueda (games); Kōichi Yamadera (anime); Scott McNeil (anime, English; animated series)

Lord Raptor was an Australian rock guitarist who had killed himself and over one hundred of his fans during a live performance. This caught the attention of an emperor named Ozomu, who resurrected the musician as an undead. A strange leather-bound book is later found that contains a passage about performing sacrifices to the king of the dimension of Makai, in which the lyrics to one of Raptor's songs, titled "Sacrifice", were included. Ozomu uses Raptor's bloodlust to his advantage, promising him power in exchange for his services. Raptor agrees, but his true plan is to slay Ozomu and take his place as emperor. This is not lost on Ozomu, who sends a bulbous, one-eyed frog-like creature named "Le Malta" to spy on Raptor, though the creature also doubles as Raptor's ally and occasional percussionist. However, when both the emperor and his castle disappear, Raptor investigates its location and finds the entrance to Majigen, as part of his plan to kill Ozomu and usurp his position. His signature "flying V" guitar is emblazoned with the Union Jack and features a small three-dimensional version of his likeness as the headstock.

He is an unplayable enemy in Namco × Capcom, and has a cameo in Marvel vs. Capcom: Clash of Super Heroes, where he is seen performing onstage at a pub. In Marvel vs. Capcom 3: Fate of Two Worlds he is seen in the ending for Marvel character Dormammu. In the 1995 animated series, Raptor is a movie star as well as a musician, and his guitar has a generic design and doubles as a weapon by shooting lasers, while his dialogue was copiously laced with titles of classic songs ("It's been a hard day's night, and I'm all shook up!"). He makes a brief appearance in the first episode of the 1997 anime miniseries when he kills a group of robed, cross-wielding Darkhunters just as he takes the stage for a concert. Both versions of Raptor were voiced by Scott McNeil, who was the only voice actor from the cartoon to reprise their role in the English dub of the anime. Pop Culture Shock released a 19" mixed-media statue of the character in 2011.

The cartoon version of Raptor was criticized by GamesRadar as "an idiotic rapping rip-off in the vein of Ninja Turtle Michelangelo". Complex rated his Darkstalkers 3 victory taunt ("Shut up! You're supposed to be dead!") in their 2012 selection of the hundred "most humiliating" video game victory quotes.

Morrigan Aensland

Pyron 
Voiced by: Nobuyuki Hiyama (games); Shinji Ogawa (anime); David Kaye (anime, English) Richard Newman (Animated series)

 is an imposing Minotaur-like alien overlord enveloped completely in fire with a pair of long horns projecting from the sides of his head. Like Huitzil, he is a boss character in the first game and a selectable in the second. Pyron has a past history with Earth, having previously tried to destroy it by unleashing the Huitzil robots to accomplish this task. He then elects to take part in Demitri's tournament as a second opportunity to consume the planet, but as was the case with his previous attempt, this plan fails as he is defeated and consumed by Demitri.

Though Pyron is not in the original arcade version of Vampire Savior, he makes a non-canonical appearance in the home console versions. He is also seen in Tekkaman: The Space Knight and during Tekkaman's ending in Tatsunoko vs. Capcom: Ultimate All Stars. In the 1995 animated series, Pyron pilots a spaceship that features a sarcastic talking computer while Demitri and Morrigan serve under his command. He is the main antagonist in the 1997 anime series, again seeking Earth's final destruction. Pyron also appears as a rival unit in tactical role-playing game Project X Zone 2.

Rikuo 
Voiced by: Yuji Ueda, Scott McNeil (Animated series)

Rikuo is a merman living in Brazil's Amazon River, and is initially the sole survivor of a colossal earthquake that demolished his underwater empire and wiped out his entire brethren. He is consumed with rage upon learning that Pyron was the culprit behind the destruction. Rikuo later comes across another survivor, Aqueria, and together they work to rebuild their empire while living in a deep crack near an ocean trench in order to ensure the safety of their dozen soon-to-be hatchlings while he searches for any other survivors. During one of these future excursions in his Darkstalkers 3 storyline, one of his sons, Ricky, disappears, causing Rikuo to question his ability to defend his kingdom if incapable of protecting his own family. He therefore heads into Jedah's realm of Majigen, where he believes his son was abducted.

Rikuo is named  in Japan (where his son, Ricky, is called "Alba"). His name is a play on that of actor and stuntman Ricou Browning, who portrayed the title character of the 1954 film Creature from the Black Lagoon (and whose son, himself an underwater stuntman, is named Ricou Jr.), on whom Rikuo's character design is loosely based. In the 1997 anime, Rikuo makes his only appearance when he is defeated in battle by Pyron in a flashback sequence at the start of the fourth episode. In the 1995 cartoon, he is depicted as being vain, as he is first seen admiring himself in a hand mirror, and a running joke throughout the series was various characters declaring to him: "You're curiously attractive for a fish-man".

Sasquatch
Voiced by: Kan Tokumaru, Dale Wilson (Animated series)

 is a rotund and good-natured bigfoot/Yeti hybrid hominid that lives with his tribe in the Canadian region of the Rocky Mountains. Upon sensing Pyron's presence, he leaves his village to find its source, but upon his return, he discovers a giant hole in the now-deserted village, which is actually an entrance into Majigen; Jedah had suckered Sasquatch's fellow bigfoot into the portal by luring them with a generous amount of bananas.

Sasquatch has a brief role in the anime miniseries, when he fights Pyron at the outset of the fourth episode but is defeated. He was called "Bigfoot" instead of his proper name in the cartoon, and had a noncanonical troublemaking nephew named Hairball.

The character has received positive critical reception, mainly due to his strange appearance. Japanese gaming magazine Gamest named Sasquatch the ninth-best character of 1994 in their annual year-end awards, and 46th out of fifty in 1995. Sega Saturn Magazine described Sasquatch in their June 1998 issue as "a great comedy fighter". GameDaily placed Sasquatch nineteenth in their list of the top 25 favorite Capcom characters of all time: "Sasquatch is a delightful character, not only using fists and ice powers but also his mouth. Just don't kiss him". They also ranked him 20th out of the top 25 most bizarre fighting game characters: "He's the closest thing we'll ever see to a Bigfoot-esque character in a fighting game, so we'll happily list Sasquatch among the other weirdos".

Victor von Gerdenheim 
Voiced by: Kan Tokumaru, Ian James Corlett (Animated series)

 is a golem with the power to harness electricity, created by a mad scientist of the same name in a project three decades in the making. However, Professor Victor von Gerdenheim dies shortly after giving life to his monstrous namesake. Unaware of his master's demise, while believing that he would be accepted if he proves that he is the strongest being in the world, Victor leaves his home and birthplace, a castle located somewhere in Germany. After Victor combats many Darkstalkers, he comes back to the castle, where he meets his younger "sister" Emily, who is another of the late professor's creations, though far smaller in size and human in appearance. They live happily for many years until Emily malfunctions. Victor allows himself to be lured into the Majigen by Jedah, believing that he can revive Emily by collecting the souls held captive therein, but in the end he ultimately ends up sacrificing himself to revive Emily.

The character is a nod to Frankenstein's monster, as well as the fictional scientist behind his creation. Victor makes his only appearance in the anime miniseries at the start of the final episode, when he is defeated by Pyron in a brief fight. He is featured in the fourth episode of the animated series, in which he has a noncanonical assistant named Klaus, but he is not seen again on the show thereafter until the series finale with all the other Darkstalkers characters. An action figure set featuring Victor (with a "pop-out brain" feature) and an unnamed glow-in-the-dark "ghost assistant" was released by Toy Biz in 1999. Gamest named him the 39th-best character in their 1994 year-end awards.

Introduced in Night Warriors

Anita
Voiced by: Kyoko Hikami (Darkstalkers 3); Akiko Yajima (anime); Andrea Libman (anime, English)

 is a diminutive, taciturn, and emotionally detached young girl whose family was slaughtered by a Darkstalker while she was later shunned by her orphanage as a witch after having exhibited strange and unexplained psychic powers. She and vampire hunter Donovan Baine interact for the first time after she is threatened by a hideous monster that he dispatches. In order to prove that Anita was still capable of producing emotion, Donovan coolly cuts her doll with his sword, a maneuver that succeeds as it provokes from her a psychic burst of anger. With nowhere else to go, Anita, who keeps and constantly clutches her torn doll, accompanies Donovan in attempt to find herself and also help him fight off the Darkstalkers in her quest for revenge, while Donovan serves as her protector and guardian.

Anita has never been a playable character in any of the Darkstalkers games, but made her first crossover appearance as a secret playable in the Only in Japanese port and "Marvel vs Capcom Origins" of Marvel Super Heroes, in which she psychically wields Donovan's sword, with a red ribbon tied to its handle. She also appeared as a supporting character in Marvel vs. Capcom: Clash of Super Heroes. In her first of only two appearances in the 1995 cartoon, she is still under Donovan's watch, but Demitri is seen attacking her parents, while her name was changed to "Amanda" (the name she was originally given in the North American version of Night Warriors, before it was changed back due to a translation oversight in her Marvel Super Heroes appearance) and her hair from brunette to blonde, and she carries around a stuffed dinosaur instead of a doll.

Donovan Baine
Voiced by: Nobuyuki Hiyama (Darkstalkers 2); Jurota Kosugi (Darkstalkers 3); Unshō Ishizuka (anime); Ari Solomon (anime, English), Garry Chalk (Animated series)

 is a dhampir, the offspring of an affair between a vampire male and a human female. His true origin is a mystery, but he was ostracized as a child due to his tainted blood. Following a tragic event that resulted in his mother's death, Donovan becomes a drifter, wandering the world and becoming a Buddhist monk in an attempt to control his massive power and inner turmoil, all the while seeking answers to his cursed existence. He sports a bandolier of large stone spirit beads and possesses a giant magical sword called "Dhylec", which features a serrated gaping mouth carved into the blade and has the ability to channel both divine and elemental powers. Donovan makes his trade as a vampire hunter and a force of justice feared by all evil, while serving as the guardian and protector of a young orphan girl named Anita, who is his constant companion.

Donovan's role as Anita's guardian and hunter of evil is unchanged in the cartoon, minor differences being that he teams up with Hsien-Ko to (unsuccessfully) apprehend Demitri and breaks Bishamon's curse on separate occasions. His name was misspelled as "Donovon Bane" on the packaging of the U.S. DVD series release. He is one of the central characters in the anime miniseries, notably opting to suffer when seriously wounded in combat, even at the risk of his own life, in hopes of his dark blood leaving his body in the process.

Hsien-Ko

Introduced in Darkstalkers 3

Baby Bonnie Hood

Jedah Dohma

Lilith 
Voiced by: Hiroko Konishi (game); Yuka Imai (Namco x Capcom, Cross Edge), Miyuki Sawashiro (Onimusha Soul)

 is a creation of Jedah spawning from his theft of a segment of power that Belial Aensland had previously split from Morrigan and sealed away in an isolated location in order to keep his daughter's total formidable power from raging out of control. However, after Belial's death, the stashed power suspiciously develops a will of its own. Jedah attempts to capitalize on this turn of events by stealing the power and crafting it a physical form that would become Lilith, herself a succubus and essentially a younger, childlike clone of Morrigan. In exchange for being given life, she would lure Morrigan and the other Darkstalkers into Majigen, which she identifies as her birthplace. Lilith lives blissfully until realizing she is not an original being but merely a part of another person. Meanwhile, Morrigan does not feel as close a connection to Lilith as much as the other way around; in response, Jedah manipulates Lilith to meet Morrigan in person so he can use them both to extend his power, but Lilith becomes aware that Jedah has been lying to her in regards to her existence.

Lilith, whose name was inspired by the mythological Lilith, was designed as a female character but Darkstalkers 3 scenario writer/planner Haruo Murata wanted her to be a hermaphrodite or a "male daughter" with shorter hair and a completely flat chest; when the game was released, the character's gender was officially listed as "unknown". Lilith has made crossover appearances in Marvel vs. Capcom: Clash of Super Heroes, Tatsunoko vs. Capcom: Ultimate All-Stars, Pocket Fighter, Capcom Fighting Evolution, Namco x Capcom, and Cross Edge, usually appearing together with Morrigan. An action figure of the character was released as part of a two-pack with Demitri by Toy Biz in 1999. Several figurines were released by various manufacturers, including Banpresto.

Q-Bee 
Voiced by: Miyuki Matsushita (Darkstalkers 3, Project X Zone 2); Arisa Nishiguchi (Project X Zone)

, short for Queen Bee (her title), is a youthful bee-human hybrid. She is part of a Makaian species known as the "Soul Bees", who lived on land owned by the Dohma family but suddenly faced extinction after Jedah's death and the lengthy period that followed prior to his resurrection. She therefore heads into Majigen to gather souls in order to satiate her hunger as well as those of her subjects. Q-Bee actually has two sets of eyes: the normal ones on her face are non functioning decoys to trick her enemies as her working eyes, larger in size, are on the top of her head, while her vocals in the game consist mostly of buzzing sounds. She also appears as an enemy in Namco × Capcom, Project X Zone and Project X Zone 2, and features in the SNK vs. Capcom: Card Fighters Clash series.Sega Saturn Magazine considered Q-Bee the game's equivalent of Chun-Li due to her "blinding speed". GamesRadar described the character as "carnivorous, sexxxy, human-sized and able to sting endlessly without dying. That's actually the scariest notion Darkstalkers has served up thus far".

Secret characters

Dee 
Voiced by: Jurota Kosugi (Vampire Darkstalkers Collection)
A corrupt dhampir version of Donovan Baine and inspired by the events of Donovan's Night Warriors: Darkstalkers' Revenge ending, Dee is a playable secret character exclusive to the Japanese PlayStation 2 game Vampire: Darkstalkers Collection. In his Night Warriors: Darkstalkers' Revenge ending, Donovan defeats the Darkstalkers, but at the cost of absorbing the evil of his defeated opponents and losing his humanity in the process. Dee is presented in Vampire: Darkstalkers Collection as an incarnation of Donovan based on this ending and was designed as a red palette swap of Demitri's body with Donovan's head and the sword Dhylec. In his game ending, he confronts an older Anita after defeating Jedah. While the events of the fight were not shown, a cutscene during the end credits shows Anita visiting a gravesite.

Dark Talbain 
Dark Jon Talbain is a maroon-hued palette swap, and evil counterpart, of Jon Talbain. He serves as a boss for Jon Talbain in Vampire Savior and is also a hidden playable character.

Marionette
Marionette is a young woman who is, as her name implies, a human marionette, dressed in fairy-like attire of a short flower petal skirt with a matching oversized collar and jester hat. She is suspended by strings and has a wind-up key fastened to her back. The malevolent phantom and fellow secret character Shadow transformed and then enslaved her in order to help further fulfill his own personal tasks. Marionette appears in Vampire Savior 2 and Vampire Hunter 2 and selecting her will force players to play in the same form as their current opponent.

Oboro Bishamon
Oboro Bishamon is a dull-orange palette swap of Bishamon who first appeared in Vampire Savior. This version of the character is a depiction of the result of Bishamon having conquered and mastered the evil of the Hannya armor, an example being that he willingly removes the armor either before or after a fight.

Shadow
Shadow is a blue phantom-like creature accessible in all versions of Vampire Savior by entering a button combination on the character select screen, and forces the player to play as their just-defeated opponent. He was created in Majigen with the ability to possess newly defeated opponents. Shadow's goal involves stealing souls from other beings in order to increase his own power and learn his enemies' strengths and weaknesses, and has enslaved Marionette to assist him in his mission.

Other media

Harry Grimoire
Harry is a 12-year-old boy who is a direct descendant of Merlin made exclusively for the 1995 cartoon.

John Stately
A young man who finds and takes care of Lilith in the Vampire Savior manga.

Notes

References

 
Darkstalkers
Lists of video game characters